Scheissmessiah is the fourth full-length release by American industrial metal band Hanzel und Gretyl. It was released on October 12, 2004, via Metropolis Records. Like the CD that preceded it, Über alles, it is a concept album that parodied Handel's Messiah with a satanic metal twist.

Track listing 
 "Lust" – 2:12
 "Fikk dich mit Fire" – 3:23
 "Kaiser von Shizer" – 3:13
 "Disko Fire Scheiss Messiah" – 4:19
 "Blut! Sex! Fire!" – 3:22
 "Burning Bush" – 2:54
 "Scheissway to Hell" – 4:00
 "And We Shall Purify" – 3:38
 "10th Circle" – 4:06
 "Hellalujah" – 3:00
 "Purity" – 5:47

Credits 
Kaizer von Loopy: lead guitar, lead vocals on tracks 3 and 6, programming
Vas Kallas: lead vocals, guitar, additional programming
Anna K: Bass
Mixed by Arun Venkatesh, at Big Blue Meenie, Jersey City, New Jersey
Mastered by Tom Hutten at Bionic Mastering, in Soho, New York

References

External links 
Official Hanzel und Gretyl website
Official MySpace page
Metropolis Records
Big Blue Meenie Studios
Bionic Mastering

Hanzel und Gretyl albums
2004 albums
Metropolis Records albums
Concept albums